Paco is an inactive volcano,  in elevation, located at 9°35.6' North, 125°31.1' East, in the province of Surigao del Norte, region of Caraga, island of Mindanao, the Philippines.

References

Volcanoes of Mindanao
Mountains of the Philippines
Landforms of Surigao del Norte
Inactive volcanoes of the Philippines